The Chamber of Auditors of the Republic of Azerbaijan is an Azerbaijani government agency. It is an independent financial control body.

History 
The Azerbaijani law “On Auditor Services was signed by President Heydar Aliyev on the 16th of September 1994. In 1995, the National Assembly (Milli Mejlis) of the Republic of Azerbaijan made a decision on regulations about the Chamber. The Chamber of Auditors began operations on the 5th of April 1996. The Chamber of Auditors became a full member of the European Federation of Accountants and Auditors on the 5th of May 2003. In November of the same year, the Chamber was accepted as an associate member of the International Federation of Accountants. The Organisation started a project on “Strengthening the capacity of audit conducting of the Chamber of Auditors of Azerbaijan Republic and preparing specialists” on June 24, 1997, and successfully completed in 1999. The first issue of the journal titled “Economics and Auditing” was published on July 5, 2000. “Economics and Auditing” was presented in National Assembly of Azerbaijan. In 2001 first educational book that prepared for higher schools by Chamber of Auditors of Azerbaijan Republic was published.

Its chairman is Novruzov Vahid Tapdig, the deputy chairman is Isamyilov Fakhraddin Hasan, and the head of the office is Bayramov Gasham Hajali.

Functions 
The functions of the Chamber of Auditors include organizing and managing audit service, providing the license to independent auditors and auditor organizations, determine the examine fee, giving advice to independent auditors and auditor organizations, preparing different report forms, as well as preparing proposals for improvement of audit services, monitoring Monitors and controls financial and economic activity of independent auditor, audit organization, independent external auditor and branch or representative of the external audit, etc.

International relations 
Chamber of Auditors of the Republic of Azerbaijan is collaborating with relevant state institutions of Russia, Turkey, Ukraine, Kazakhstan, Canada, France, Poland, Georgia, Romania, Uzbekistan and so on. The institution is cooperating with the following foreign bodies;

 Board of Auditors of the Russian Federation
 The Institute of Internal Auditors of Turkey
 Professional Accountants and Auditors of Ukraine
 Union of Independent Accountant Financial Advisory and Chambers of Certified Public Accountant and Advisory of Turkey
 Lithuanian Chamber of Auditors
 Chamber of Auditors of the Republic of Kazakhstan
 Latvian Association of Certified Auditors
 Slovak Chamber of Auditors
 Certified General Accountants Association of Canada
 Professional Association of Expert Accountants of France
 National Association of Auditors of France
 Samara Territorial Institute of Professional Accountants;
 Polish National Chamber of Auditors
 Association of Chartered Certified Accountants
 China Institute of Internal Auditors
 Union of Auditors ok Ukraine
 Chamber of Auditors of Russia
 Audit Council under the Georgian Parliament
 Romanian Chamber of Financial Auditors
 Chamber of Auditors of the Republic of Uzbekistan
 Hungarian Chamber of Auditors
 Baltic International Academy
 Ukrainian Chamber of Auditors
 Association of Professional Accountants and Auditors of Moldova
 Institute of Professional Accountants and Auditors of Russia
 St. Petersburg Chamber of Auditors
 Moscow Chamber of Auditors
 Istanbul Chamber of Independent Certified Public Accountants
 Center of qualification improvement for managers and specialists of the Ministry of Finance of the Republic of Belarus
 Institute of Certified Auditors of the Republic of Macedonia
 The Federation of auditors, accountants and financial managers of Georgia
 Belarusian union of accountants and auditor
 Estonian Auditors’ Association

Duties and functions of the institution 

 Implementing the registration of financial and accounting records and ensuring it is done in honest and reliable way regardless of the type of ownership in all areas of the economy. For this purpose, it takes measures in order to improve the auditor service and its performance;
 Organizing and regulating auditor service within the borders of the Republic of Azerbaijan;
 Granting licenses to independent auditors and auditing organizations in the territory of the Republic of Azerbaijan. It oversees their work and ensures that statues of those institutions are acting in way that defined by the Law of the Republic of Azerbaijan "On auditor services"
 Preparing and approving the rules for exams to obtain licenses in order to engage in auditor services within the territory of the Republic of Azerbaijan;
 Preparing and approving the members of the committee and its statue for issuing licenses for auditing activities and defining the fee for examination;
 Preparing and approving the forms of audit opinion, the work of independent auditors and auditor organizations in accordance with the requirements of the Civil Code of the Republic of Azerbaijan on financial and accounting reports of the enterprises;
 Advising independent auditors and auditing organizations on issues related to the generalization of auditing practice and application of existing legislation, and prepares proposals for the development and improvement of the auditor service and ensuring their implementations;
 Preparing guidelines, recommendations and methodic instructions in auditing process;
 Drawing up normative documents upon form and methods of auditing services, and preparing corresponding recommendations on the basis of learning national and foreign experience;
 Monitoring the financial activities of independent auditor organization, independent foreign auditors or their branches on the basis of the Law of the Republic of Azerbaijan "On Audit Service;"
 Providing auditor's opinion on the validity of valuation of property of entrepreneurships based on privatization of state-owned enterprises;

References

External links 
 https://www.ifac.org/about-ifac/membership/members/chamber-auditors-azerbaijan-republic
 http://www.cesd.az/wp/economic-1.htm
 https://web.archive.org/web/20110909083153/http://abc.az/eng/b2b/category_149/943.html
 http://abc.az/eng/news/95190.html

Audit legislation
Government of Azerbaijan
Government agencies of Azerbaijan